Inami is a French animated television series set in Amazonia. It was directed by Michael Pillyser, and is distributed by the French company Mediatoon. The series first aired in France on TF1 in 2007, as part of the TFOU TV programming block.

Plot 
The series revolves around the adventures of Inami, a young Amazonian native of the tribe of the Bellacaibos who faces many adventures through the forest facing several enemies next to his animal pair Tatune, his best friend Shimiwe and his secret friend Hyaema, of the tribe of Patamis.

Characters
 Inami, an 11-year-old boy of the Bellacaïbos tribe
 Aminata, Inami's little sister, who mimics his actions
 Tatoon, Inami's pet armadillo, his totem
 Shimiwe, Inami's best friend
 Carras, the old and wise
 Hyaema, an 11-year-old girl of the Patami tribe, the hereditary enemy of the Bellacaïbos and Inami's crush
 Moricas, the malicious shaman of the Patami tribe and major antagonist

Episodes
I Had a Dream...
The Dark of Curtian
The Pink Dolphin
The Salt Quest
The Vemon of Contention
The Secret
The Four Element
Big Brother
The Flame Mans
The Forbidden Sanctuary
The Dark Shaman
The Crocodile Scales
The Price of Freedom
A Tatoune Full of Colors
The Livin Mountain
A Strange Village
The Black Diamon
The Double Link
The Well of Dream
Mystery Island
The Tatou Family
The Eyes of The Big Tatou
The Twelve teeth of the Shark
The Life of The Life
The Strange Message of the Herburas
The Test of Peace

Broadcast
The series has aired in Africa, Belgium, Brazil, Hungary, Israel, Italy, Portugal, Romania, Serbia and Turkey.

See also
Alain Royer

References

External links 
 

2000s French animated television series
2007 French television series debuts
Environmental television
French children's animated adventure television series
Animated television series about children